Igor Grigoriev, (born on January 24, 1955, in Moscow) is a musician, composer, arranger, band leader, and improvisational guitarist. He taught himself to play the guitar as a young child, and later obtained his master's degree from a music institution in Russia.

Biography

As a young boy in late sixties, he was interested in latest music of the time, Rock. As he developed musically, he became interested in Charlie Parker's work, but in later years the influence of classical composers has become evident in his music. Bach has made a great influence in his musical career. He is also fascinated by John Cage's work and the color black.

On September 25, 2010, Igor, a great musician and teacher, died and was survived by his wife and children. He will be missed and live on in spirit through they many that were his students and those that study under them.

Career
At a very young age Igor started his career and gained fame by playing rock music with many Russian bands and touring around the world. Later, he became a band leader and led the trio, Roof, with trumpeter Andrew Solovyov, and percussionist Michael Zhukov (Melodia Records, Leo Records). His group, Asphalt also gained tremendous popularity despite its short life span (Melodia Records).

He permanently migrated to United States in 1989 and continued his career, as a Classical and Jazz musician, but later he became more and more interested in Avant-garde music.

Igor is probably better known for his 1990s work, which rapidly assimilated the American avant-garde and forged his own, instantly identifiable style. His music of the 1970s and 1980s saw transition from rock to classical to jazz and to avant-garde music; sometimes he makes use of Harmolodic system of Ornette Coleman. He began to develop methods of simultaneously improvising bass lines, harmony and melodic lines. In his later years, his playing became less predictable and formulaic.

He has recorded number of solo albums, and has recorded or performed with Stan Getz, Red Callender, Larry Gales, Milcho Leviev, Ira Schulman, Rod Oakes, and many others. His main musical partner in recent years (2000s) has been trombonist Rod Oakes (including early recording Live In Your Bedroom, Oakes Plays Rod, and most recently, Redux – all on III Records).

The major part of his work is performing unaccompanied – still a rare feature among non-classical guitar instrumentalists.

Igor and Rod Oakes founded OGOGO in 1996, which is one of the most important organizations to perform improvised music. (The OGOGO is still going, though now it can be anywhere from solo to extra large ensemble.) Nowadays Igor has a close association with III Records.

Although Igor's central focus is free improvisation, he has also occasionally appeared in more conventional jazz and classical contexts, such as big band, various ensembles, and string orchestra.

He has composed and arranged for a wide range of music genres. He has worked as part of the orchestra for Russian circus. He has arranged music for theatrical plays.

Other
He is a well known artist in Europe and United States, and his continues effort, originality, and creativity has made him popular around the world.while he works on creating his one of kind music, his wife, Kimia, is usually in charge of his publications and press releases. 
You can say that he, like his music, has an Avent-garde personality. It is not clear if his personality reflects into his art, or his art reflects into his personality; maybe a little bit of both. Sometimes him and his music are both misunderstood. Nevertheless, he is a musical genius and has a vast knowledge in many things, however music is his main interest. 
Igor now teaches guitar, music history, jazz history, ensembles, and improvisation at Los Angeles Harbor College and Cerritos College in Los Angeles, CA.

Lately he has been presenting his music by releasing EPs such as Vodka Cocktail, Snowflake, and Chocolate Ice Cream.

Discography
Igor has been featured on many albums and has been a guest star in many concerts and recording. The following are just a few of his works. for more info refer to his website: Igor Grigoriev's Discography

Albums
Roof
Asphalt
Live in Your Bedroom

EPs
Vodka Cocktail
Snowflake
Chocolate Ice Cream

External links
https://web.archive.org/web/20080620103204/http://igorogogo.com/index.htm
http://www.myspace.com/ogogoigor
https://web.archive.org/web/20060222012915/http://www.iiirecords.com/igor.htm
http://igorguitar.googlepages.com/home
https://web.archive.org/web/20061125040921/http://www.allaboutjazz.com/php/musician.php?id=2013

1955 births
Russian musicians
American people of Russian descent
2010 deaths
Soviet emigrants to the United States